A pecan grove is an orchard for pecans, see pecan grove (orchard). For locations named Pecan Grove see:

 Pecan Grove (Church Hill, Mississippi), listed on the NRHP in Mississippi
 Pecan Grove, Texas
 Pecan Grove, Collin County, Texas, an unincorporated community